This is a list of Hindi films released in 2012.

Box office collection
The ten highest worldwide grossing Bollywood films of 2012 are as follows:

January – March

April – June

July – September

October – December

See also
 List of Bollywood films of 2013
 List of Bollywood films of 2011

References

Lists of 2012 films by country or language
2012
2012 in Indian cinema